The South Devon Football League, known under a sponsorship arrangement as the TCSSDFL, is a football competition based in England. Its top division, the Premier Division, sits at level 12 of the English football league system. This league is a feeder to the Devon Football League. There are five divisions in the league. The SDFL's primary cup competition is the Herald Cup. It is a simple knockout competition featuring all SDFL clubs (first teams only).

Following the formation of the East Devon FA in 1903, the league came into existence as the Torquay and District League for the 1903/04 season. The first winners were Ellacombe. The league changed its name to the South Devon League for the 1920/21 season.

Recent Herald Cup winners

Recent Divisional champions

Division discontinued

2022–23 Members

Premier Division
Brixham A.F.C. Reserves | Buckfastleigh Rangers | Chudleigh Athletic | East Allington United | Elburton Villa Reserves | Ivybridge Town Reserves | Kingsteignton Athletic | Newton Abbot '66 | Paignton Saints Reserves | Waldon Athletic | Watts Blake Bearne

Division One
Babbacombe Corinthians | Barton Athletic | Beesands Rovers | Buckfastleigh Rangers Reserves | Harbertonford | Ilsington Villa | Morley Rangers | Paignton Villa | Plympton Athletic Reserves | Torquay Town | Upton Athletic

Division Two
Brixham Town | Dartmouth A.F.C. Reserves | East Allington United Reserves | Newton Abbot Spurs 'A' | Newton Rovers | Paignton Villa Reserves | Stoke Gabriel & Torbay Police Reserves  | Totnes, Dartington & Meadowbrook | Watcombe Wanderers | Watts Blake Bearne Reserves

Division Three
Barton Athletic Reserves | Bovey Tracey Reserves | Brixham Town Reserves | Chudleigh Athletic Reserves | Ipplepen Athletic Reserves | Kingsbridge & Kellaton United | Newton Abbot '66 Reserves | Paignton Saints 'A' | Waldon Athletic Reserves

Division Four
Babbacombe Corinthians Reserves | Broadhempston United   | Kingsteignton Athletic Reserves | Liverton United | Newton Rovers Reserves | Paignton Villa 'A' | South Brent | Totnes, Dartington & Meadowbrook Reserves | Waldon Athletic 'A' | Watcombe Wanderers Reserves

Other SDFL Cup competitions
The SDFL also run an additional 6 cup competitions. These are:

Fred Hewings Cup  (Reserve Sides)
George Belli Cup  (Premier Divisional Cup)
Dartmouth Cup     (First Divisional Cup)
Lidstone Cup      (Second Divisional Cup)
Ronald Cup        (Third Divisional Cup)
Les Bishop Cup    (Fourth Divisional Cup)

References

External links
SDFL website Official website
Full-Time League Site on FA Full-Time

 
Football in Devon
Football leagues in England